Haripad railway station (Code: HAD) is a (NSG 5 Category station) railway station in Alappuzha district, Kerala, and falls under the Thiruvananthapuram railway division of the Southern Railway zone, Indian Railways.

References

Railway stations in Alappuzha district
Railway stations opened in 1989